The basic unit of local government in Morocco is the commune. At the time of the 2014 population census, Morocco was divided into 1538 communes, 256 of which were classified as urban and also called municipalities. The remaining 1282 communes were classified as rural. Urban centres were defined by the High Commission for Planning for some rural communes. 

The following list includes all Moroccan municipalities with 50,000 or more inhabitants, as well as one urban centre of a rural commune whose population also exceeds 50,000 inhabitants. In its 2014 census report, the High Commission for Planning also published a list of the legal populations of seven major Moroccan cities, some of which comprise more than one administrative unit. Those legal population figures are incorporated into the list, and the city definitions they are based upon are provided in the notes.

List of cities with 50,000 or more inhabitants

See also
List of cities in Western Sahara
List of metropolitan areas in Africa
List of largest cities in the Arab world

Notes

References

Morocco, List of cities in
Cities
Morocco